

Creation 
This office was created under law No. 15 of February 28, 2017, as amended (law No. 1 of January 3, 2018, Law No. 125 of July 10, 2018, Law No. 203 of August 5, 2018) with the purpose of strengthening the mechanisms of prevention, control, investigation and audit of government management; perform audits and consultancies in government entities aimed at achieving optimal levels of economy, efficiency and effectiveness of their administrative systems and risk management, control and direction; achieve, with a greater degree of possible security, reliable information; and encourage compliance with applicable laws, regulations and norms.

Mission 
Consolidate the resources and efforts of the Government of Puerto Rico to promote a healthy public administration and through effective pre-intervention, the optimal functioning of its institutions.

Vision 
Serve as a government entity recognized locally and internationally and achieve through internal audits and preventive actions the effective and efficient operation of funds and public property of the Government of Puerto Rico.

Values 
The Office of the Inspector General is governed by five (5) fundamental values:

Jurisdiction
According to Article 4 of Law No. 15-2017, as amended, the Office of the Inspector General will have access to information and documents related to the budget of all government entities. The OIG will not have jurisdiction over the Legislative and Judicial branches and will not be able to intervene with the following entities.

Excluded Entities

References
https://www.oig.pr.gov

Office of the Governor of Puerto Rico